La maschera e il volto is a comedy of grotesque genre by Luigi Chiarelli. Written in 1913 and first presented in 1916, it is historically significant for starting the contemporary grotesque theatre. It had a great success first in Italy and then internationally, and continues to be represented. Several movies have been adapted from the play.

References

External links
The mask and the face; a satire in three acts

Italian plays
Grotesque
1913 plays